Ellen Gertrude Cohen,  (born 1846, date of death unknown) was a British painter and illustrator.

Biography
Cohen was born in 1846. She attended the Slade School of Art and the Royal Academy of London. She also studied in Paris under Jean-Joseph Benjamin-Constant and Jean-Paul Laurens.

She exhibited her work at the Royal Academy, Royal Institute of Painters in Water and Oil Colors, and the Paris Salon.

Cohen exhibited her work at the Palace of Fine Arts at the 1893 World's Columbian Exposition in Chicago, Illinois.

Cohn created illustrations for a variety of British publications including The Strand Magazine.

Cohen's date of death is unknown.

Images from the Illustrated London News

References

External links
images of Ellen Gertrude Cohen's paintings on artNET

1859 births
Year of death missing
19th-century British painters
19th-century British women artists
British women painters
British illustrators
British women illustrators
Alumni of the Slade School of Fine Art
Alumni of the Royal Academy Schools
British Jews